Mabote District is a district of Inhambane Province in south-east Mozambique. Its principal town is Mabote. The district is located at the northwest of the province and borders with Machaze District of Manica Province and Machanga District of Sofala Province in the north, Govuro District in the east, Inhassoro District in the southeast, Funhalouro District in the south, and with Chigubo and Massangena Districts of Gaza Province in the west. In terms of the area, this is the biggest district of Inhambane Province. It has a population of 45101 as of 2007.

Geography
The Save River borders the district in its northern part. There are no other rivers of any size in the district; several existing lakes are seasonal and only exist during the rainy season.

Zinave National Park is located in the district.

History
In 1986, Mabote District, which was previously a posto belonging to Govuro District, was made a separate district.

Administrative divisions
The district is divided into three postos, Mabote, Zimane, and Zinave, which in total include eight localities.

Demographics
As of 2005, 41% of the population of the district was younger than 15 years. 17% did speak Portuguese. The population was predominantly Tswa, speaking Tswa language. 81% were analphabetic, mostly women.

Economy
There is limited production of natural gas in the district.

Agriculture
The district has  of agricultural lands. The main agricultural products are corn, sorghum, peanuts, and cowpea.

Transportation

References

Districts in Inhambane Province
States and territories established in 1986